Roscoe Niiquaye Dsane (born 16 October 1980) is an English professional footballer who last played for Isthmian Division One South side Walton Casuals as a striker.

A Crystal Palace youth product, Dsane made his professional debut for Southend United before spells at Slough Town and Woking in 2002. He joined Aldershot Town in May 2002 for a three-year stint, followed by moves to Wealdstone and Lewes. In July 2006, Dsane joined AFC Wimbledon and earned a move to Accrington Stanley a year later. In January 2008, he completed a move to Torquay United for an undisclosed fee. Following a year-long absence, Dsane returned to AFC Wimbledon in 2011, followed by moves to Merstham and Whyteleafe. He joined current club Walton Casuals in December 2016.

Dsane has represented England at semi-professional level, scoring four times for the National Game XI.

Career
Born in Epsom, Dsane spent four years as a junior with Crystal Palace before joining Southend United in November 2001. He made his debut as a second-half substitute for Leon Johnson in Southend's 1–0 defeat at home to Plymouth Argyle and started the next game, a 2–0 defeat away to Shrewsbury Town. These were to be his only first team appearances for Southend and he moved to Slough Town on a free transfer and then to Woking in January 2002.

He moved to Aldershot Town in May 2002 and helped Aldershot to promotion to the Conference at the end of the following season. He scored 21 goals for Aldershot to help them to the playoff final in their first season in the Nationwide Conference in 2003–04. However, he lost his position after a knee injury, and was released by Aldershot in May 2005. He rejoined Aldershot after more than a year out injured and played for their reserve team in November 2005.

In March 2006, he joined Wealdstone, for a brief spell without appearing in their Isthmian League side, before joining AFC Wimbledon for the 2006–07 season. His 17 goals in the Isthmian Premier Division helped them reach the playoff semi-finals.

He was linked with a move to Torquay United, but on 18 June 2007, joined Accrington Stanley. He scored seven times in 22 league games for Stanley, but on 25 January 2008, signed for Torquay for an undisclosed fee. Dsane's contract was cancelled on the last day of the regular season.

In January 2011, after a year-long absence from football, Dsane began training with Conference National club AFC Wimbledon, before the club announcing he had signed for them on 2 February, beginning his second spell with them after his stint in the 2006–7 season. He was signed on a non-contract basis, allowing him to also register and play for Beaconsfield SYCOB of the Southern Football League Division One Central.

In August 2011, Dsane joined Merstham whose manager Andy Martin was a former teammate of D'Sane at Crystal Palace.

Dsane left Merstham to join his local side Whyteleafe in February 2013 scoring two goals on his debut against Lordswood, helping his new side gain promotion back to the Isthmian League in 2013–14.

In December 2016, Dsane joined Isthmian League Division One South side Walton Casuals.

Statistics

Notes

References

External links

Living people
1980 births
Sportspeople from Epsom
English footballers
England semi-pro international footballers
Association football forwards
Crystal Palace F.C. players
Southend United F.C. players
Slough Town F.C. players
Woking F.C. players
Aldershot Town F.C. players
Wealdstone F.C. players
Lewes F.C. players
AFC Wimbledon players
Accrington Stanley F.C. players
Torquay United F.C. players
Beaconsfield Town F.C. players
Merstham F.C. players
Whyteleafe F.C. players
Walton Casuals F.C. players
English Football League players
National League (English football) players
Isthmian League players